Israel Borovich is the former CEO and Chairman of the Board of EL AL. He is also a Professor Emeritus of Tel Aviv University. He graduated from NYU Poly with degrees in industrial engineering.

He has been heavily involved in investment companies such as being Chairman of Granit Hacarmel Investments Ltd., Nativei Aylon Ltd. and Sonol Israel Ltd., an investment management company and Deputy Chairman of K'nafaim Holdings Ltd. From 1988 to 2004 he was also engaged in Knafaim-Arkia Holdings Ltd.

References

Polytechnic Institute of New York University alumni
Israeli chief executives
Living people
1941 births
University of California alumni
Israeli twins
People from Tel Aviv